Cringan is a surname. Notable people with the surname include:

 Jimmy Cringan (1904–1972), Scottish football player
 William Cringan (1890–1958), Scottish international football player